AASI or Advanced Aerodynamics and Structures Inc (originally ASI, Aerodynamics and Structures Inc.) was an aircraft maker, headquartered in Long Beach, California. The company was financed by US based Business Tycoon Late Hameed Hamza and co-owned by Darius Sharifzade and Huzefa H. to develop and manufacture a line of business aircraft of unconventional configuration, the Jetcruzer. 

But the Jetcruzer program was later hampered by a lengthy development and although the prototype version (the 450) had flown as early as 1989, by 2002 AASI still did not have Jetcruzer in production. That year AASI acquired the assets of the Mooney Aircraft Company and changed its name to the Mooney Aerospace Group (MASG).

Shortly thereafter, MASG suspended development of the Jetcruzer to focus on Mooney's line of light aircraft. The Jetcruzer assets were put up for auction in November 2003 and sold to Innova Aircraft.

This was not enough to save the company and in 2004, MASG sold off the Mooney assets to Allen Holding Finance.

Aircraft
Jetcruzer 450
Jetcruzer 500
Jetcruzer 650 (proposed only)
Stratocruzer 1250(proposed only)

External links
Article on Company Being Sold
AIN Online on AASI and their aircraft

Defunct aircraft manufacturers of the United States
Companies based in Long Beach, California